Stockholm Pride (styled as STHLM Pride) is an annual gay pride festival held in Stockholm, the capital of Sweden. Since the start in 1998, Stockholm Pride has grown. In 2014, some 60,000 participated and 600,000 followed the parade at the streets.

The celebrations normally starts with lectures and exhibitions all over the city on the Monday. Pride House is the festival's cultural centre. It is packed with seminars, debates, workshops, exhibitions, film, theatre and other performances.

On the Wednesday it's the grand opening of the closed off Pride Park which is the festival arena for tens of thousands of people, and in the park organisation stalls, stages, restaurants, shops, and other attractions are built. Pride Park is open Wednesday through Sunday and every afternoon and evening a wide variety of famous artists and shows appear on the main stage.

Also outside the official Pride Park, there is a green and leafy area where people join up, drink, listen to the music and party into the warm summer night.

Many people have been out on the streets of Stockholm, enjoying the parade that ends in the park.

In addition to the official Stockholm Pride events, the week is noticeable elsewhere in the city. Many of the gay clubs have their own events and themed nights, one of these is Mr Gay Sweden.

The festival is held in the end of July or beginning of August each year.

In 1998, 2008 and 2018, Stockholm Pride was the host of the EuroPride.

Dog-tag
Each year, a unique design accessory is created to accompany the Stockholm Pride festival event. The Dog-tag is chosen through a design competition, alternating internationally renowned names such as Jean Paul Gaultier, Efva Attling, Lars Wallin and young debutant designer.

Earlier dogtag designers
1998 – Efva Attling (silver plate pendant)
1999 – Camilla Wessman (white plastic plate)
2000 – Tom Hedqvist (rubberband spelling "faith", "hope" and "love")
2001 – Lars Wallin (leather strap with strass)
2002 – Christer Lindarw (silver keychain with silver plate)
2003 – Andy Gunnarsson (wrist-sweatband)
2004 – Louise Häggberg (puzzle piece that could be fitted with other pieces)
2005 – Lars Eriksson (flower)
2006 – Magnus Skogsberg (bag)
2007 – Margaretha Julle (tie)
2008 – Jake Rydqvist (pendant that could be lit up)
2009 – Alessandro Falca (silver plate with braille text spelling "Hetero")
2010 – Sofia Priftis (scarf)
2011 – Karolina Tullberg (tin bracelet, with the message "Alltid Öppen" – "Always Open")
2012 – Bea Szenfeld (metal container with unscrewable lid, containing confetti and a message)
2013 – Jean Paul Gaultier (silver-coloured berlock with the message "It is beautiful to be what you are")

See also

LGBT rights in Sweden

References

External links

 Official website of Stockholm Pride
 QX - Sweden's largest online Gay Community and Guide
 Stockholm Official Visitors Guide
 The Local - Sweden's News in English & Busy International Forum

LGBT events in Sweden
Pride parades in Europe
Culture in Stockholm
Recurring events established in 1998
1998 establishments in Sweden
Parades in Sweden
Summer events in Sweden
July events
August events